Huntley George Gordon Duff (5 July 1822 – 26 May 1856) was a Scottish first-class cricketer.

The eleventh and youngest child of Major Hugh Robert Duff and his wife, Sarah Louise Forbes, Duff was born at Inverness in July 1822. He was educated at Harrow School, attending from 1837 to 1839. He later made two appearances in first-class cricket, the first in 1844 for the Marylebone Cricket Club against Oxford University at Lord's, with the second coming for the Gentlemen of England against the Gentlemen of Kent at Canterbury in 1846. Playing as a bowler, Duff took 9 wickets in his two matches, with best innings figures of 7 for 40. He married Helen Fraser in June 1847, with the couple having two children. He died at Muirburn House in Inverness in May 1856.

References

External links

1822 births
1856 deaths
Cricketers from Inverness
People educated at Harrow School
Scottish cricketers
Marylebone Cricket Club cricketers
Gentlemen of England cricketers